Thakur College of Engineering and Technology is an engineering college in Mumbai, India. It is located in Thakur village locality in Kandivali East, a post suburb of Mumbai, founded by the Thakur Education Group in 2001 by V.K. Singh. TCET is accredited by All India Council for Technical Education (AICTE) and the Directorate of Technical Education (DTE) of the government of Maharashtra, India. This college is affiliated to the University of Mumbai. The National Assessment and Accreditation Council (NAAC) awarded an "A" grade to the college among various engineering colleges. TCET is famous for its infrastructure and possesses advanced facilities like the IITB Remote Center and Cloud Computing Labs. Recently, TCET secured position in top 200 engineering institutes in India with 193rd rank in NIRF India Rankings 2019.

Academic departments
The institute has the following departments:
 Information Technology (IT)
 Computer Engineering (COMP)
 Electronics and Telecommunication Engineering (E&TC)
 Electronics (ELEX)
 Mechanical Engineering (MECH)
 Humanities and Sciences (ES&H)
 Civil Engineering (CIVIL)
 B.Tech Artificial Intelligence & Machine Learning (AI & ML)
 B.Tech Artificial Intelligence & Data Science (AI & DS)
 B.Tech Internet of Things (IOT)

References

External links
 

Engineering colleges in Mumbai
Affiliates of the University of Mumbai
Educational institutions established in 2001
2001 establishments in Maharashtra